LaToya Bond (born February 13, 1984) is an American professional women's basketball player with the Indiana Fever of the WNBA. Born in Decatur, Illinois, Bond is 5'9" (1.75 m) tall and weighs 132 lbs (59.9 kg).

At Urbana High School in Urbana, Illinois, Bond was selected to the 2000 and 2001 State Farm Holiday Classic all-tournament teams. She finished her last season at Mizzou as the 7th leading scorer in the Big 12, blasting past the 1000 point mile-marker. She was named a Kodak/WBCA All-America Honorable Mention and made the All Big 12 First Team as well as the Big 12 Defensive Team.

After her 2002 graduation from Urbana High School, she played for the NCAA Division I Lady Tigers of the University of Missouri. She was selected by the Charlotte Sting in the second round (27th pick overall) of the 2006 WNBA Draft. The Sting folded after the 2006 WNBA season, and she was selected by the Sacramento Monarchs in a dispersal draft. However, she never played for the franchise. Before the start of the 2008 season she signed with the Indiana Fever. She has also played overseas for teams in Cyprus, Israel, and Poland.

Missouri statistics
Source

References

External links
WNBA Player Profile
Missouri Profile

1984 births
Living people
American expatriate basketball people in Cyprus
American expatriate basketball people in Israel
American expatriate basketball people in Poland
American women's basketball players
Basketball players from Illinois
Charlotte Sting players
Indiana Fever players
People from Urbana, Illinois
Missouri Tigers women's basketball players
Sportspeople from Decatur, Illinois
Guards (basketball)